Stefan Grogg (born February 16, 1974) is a Swiss former professional hockey forward who played ice and inline hockey professionally in Switzerland and the United States.
Grogg began his career playing for EHC Grindelwald youth team.  He signed with HC Fribourg-Gottéron in 1993.  Two years later Grogg moved to the U.S. and joined WCHL teams San Diego Gulls  and Anchorage Aces.  That same season (1995/96) he also played inline hockey for the San Diego Barracudas, a member of Roller Hockey International, the first major professional league for inline hockey.

Returning to Switzerland, Grogg joined EV Zug, which during that season (1997/98) won their only National League championship. His performance earned him a place on the Swiss National Team 1997, which finished 15th in the World Championships (3rd in Pool B). In 1998 Grogg was one of Switzerland's top scorers in the National League playoffs.
On the inline rink, Grogg went to the 2006 XII FIRS Inline Hockey World Championship (Detroit MI)  with the Swiss National Team (LNA). Switzerland came in fourth, losing the Bronze medal to Canada, despite two goals scored late in the game by Grogg.  With over 500 NLA games to his credit,  Grogg retired in 2007.  He achieved an ice hockey career total of 97 goals and 162 assists in regular season and playoff games, and his final team,  EHC Biel, were Swiss NLB League Champions 2006/07.

Stats

References

External links

EV Zug players
EHC Biel players
SC Langnau players
SCL Tigers players
HC Fribourg-Gottéron players
San Diego Barracudas players
San Diego Gulls (WCHL) players
Swiss ice hockey forwards
1974 births
Living people